Inquisitor perclathrata is a species of sea snail, a marine gastropod mollusk in the family Pseudomelatomidae, the turrids and allies.

This is a synonym of Clavus (Clathrodrillia) perclathrata Azuma, 1960 (nomen nudum)

Description
The length of the shell attains 27 mm.

Distribution
This marine species occurs off Japan.

References

External links
 Gastropods.com: Inquisitor perclathrata

perclathrata
Gastropods described in 1960